Wijnand "Wil" van Beveren (28 December 1911 – 5 October 2003) was a Dutch sprinter. He competed in the 100 m, 200 m and 4×100 metres relay at the 1936 Summer Olympics and finished sixth in the 200 m, running against Jesse Owens. In the relay, the Dutch team was close to a medal, but failed at a baton transfer.

Van Beveren was a medal favorite in the 100 m at the 1938 European Championships, but finished fourth. He won three national titles, two in the 200 m (1937 and 1939) and one in 100 m (1939). After World War II, he retired from competitions and became a sports journalist, first with the weekly magazine Sport & Sportwereld and then with Emmer Courant. His two sons, Jan van Beveren and Wil van Beveren Jr., became professional football players.

References

External links
Olympische Spelen Berlijn 1936
Sprint Mannen. Periode tot 1945 Deel 2

1911 births
2003 deaths
Athletes (track and field) at the 1936 Summer Olympics
Dutch male sprinters
Olympic athletes of the Netherlands
Dutch sports journalists
Sportspeople from Haarlem